Çağlayan is a neighbourhood of Kağıthane, Istanbul, Turkey. The Istanbul Justice Palace is located here.

Neighbourhoods of Kağıthane